Crush 40 is a Japanese-American hard rock band. The group consists of guitarist and composer Jun Senoue and vocalist Johnny Gioeli, although Senoue has featured other lead vocalists on a Crush 40 album.  Crush 40 is best known for their contributions to the Sonic the Hedgehog video game series.

Senoue is employed by Sega as a composer and sound director, and has worked with Sega as a composer since 1993.  While preparing music for Sonic Adventure, he contacted Gioeli to record the game's main track, "Open Your Heart".  They also recorded the soundtrack for NASCAR Arcade under the name "Sons of Angels" and released it in 2000 in Japan as the album Thrill of the Feel.  Afterward, Senoue and Gioeli stayed in contact and continued to record new music for further Sonic games, as well as their own original music, and performed live concerts.

Crush 40 has released a total of two studio albums, two live albums, two compilations, an EP, and individual tracks, mostly under Sega's Wave Master label.  The band's musical style of hard rock, considered by some to be a continuation of glam rock, has created a legacy with fans of the Sonic video game series.

History

Formation, Thrill of the Feel, and Crush 40
After graduating from college, Jun Senoue was hired by Sega in 1993 to compose music for video games. His first project in the Sonic the Hedgehog series was Sonic the Hedgehog 3 & Knuckles (1994), and he also contributed to Dark Wizard, Sonic 3D Blast, and Sega Rally 2.  During recording for Daytona USA: Championship Circuit Edition, Senoue worked with Eric Martin of Mr. Big to record the main theme, "Sons of Angels".  Senoue said he brought a rock music feel to the games he worked on, including the Sonic the Hedgehog series, because he is a "rock guy".

In 1998, Senoue contacted vocalist Johnny Gioeli during the recording process for Sonic Adventure and recorded their first song, "Open Your Heart". Senoue had previously recorded a demo of the song with Eizo Sakamoto on vocals, but Senoue has stated that he wrote the song assuming Gioeli would sing it. According to Gioeli, Senoue was a fan of Gioeli's band Hardline and connected with him via Doug Aldrich, the guitarist for Whitesnake. After making the track, the two stayed in contact, having enjoyed working together and wanting to do more. Senoue and Gioeli worked together again on songs for NASCAR Arcade. In addition to Senoue and Gioeli, Naoto Shibata and Hirotsugu Homma of Loudness played the bass and drums, respectively, for the songs, and the group took the name Sons of Angels, from the title of the song Senoue recorded with Eric Martin. In 2000, the band released Thrill of the Feel in Japan, published by Victor Entertainment. The album contained the tracks they had written for NASCAR Arcade, along with "Open Your Heart".

During the development of Sonic Adventure 2, Senoue and Gioeli reunited to record the title track, "Live & Learn". As Shibata and Homma were busy performing with Loudness and later Anthem,  was brought in to play bass, and Katsuji Kirita from Gargoyle and The Cro-Magnons played drums.  According to Vice, "Live & Learn" is one of Gioeli's favorite songs.  Senoue recorded the intro to the song for the game's trial edition; he worked on the rest of the arrangement later and completed it within one day.  He then sent a demo to Gioeli to record his vocals. Gioeli was given the task of writing the lyrics for "Live & Learn". He initially was nervous and asked Senoue if his lyrics were okay on multiple occasions, but despite this, "Live & Learn" became one of the most memorable songs on the Sonic Adventure 2 soundtrack according to Sean Aitchison of Fanbyte.

Around this time, the band was renamed Crush 40, after discovering that there was a Norwegian rock band already named Sons of Angels. When asked why he chose "Crush 40", Senoue said, "When we had to pick one, we chose the word we like... 'Crush' is one of them, and Johnny added the number. Crush is the name of the soda too... that's my favorite!" Gioeli added that his inspiration for the title was a desire to "crush" his forties, which he was approaching at the time.  Two years after the 2001 release of Sonic Adventure 2, the album Crush 40 was released by Frontiers Records. The album contained the vocal tracks from NASCAR Arcade and Sonic Adventure 2. According to Senoue, Crush 40 is specifically the band of himself and Gioeli, though tracks "It Doesn't Matter" and "Escape from the City" (sung by Tony Harnell and Ted Poley, respectively) were included on the album.  Senoue explained this was done to exhibit these songs to fans.

Recordings for Sega and The Best of Crush 40: Super Sonic Songs
In 2003, Crush 40 composed two new songs entitled "Sonic Heroes" and "What I'm Made Of..." for Sega's Sonic Heroes, the first multiplatform Sonic game. Both Senoue and Gioeli have called "What I'm Made Of..." their favorite song to perform. For Shadow the Hedgehog in 2005, Crush 40 recorded "I Am... All of Me", as well as "Never Turn Back". The drums for both songs were recorded by Toru Kawamura. Additionally, Crush 40 recorded covers of songs used in 2006's Sonic the Hedgehog, Sonic and the Secret Rings, Sonic Riders and Zero Gravity, and Sonic CD.  The band also recorded five original songs and a cover for Sonic and the Black Knight.

For their first 10 years, Crush 40 never performed live. In 2008, Crush 40 performed live at the Tokyo Game Show, with Senoue and Gioeli performing with backing tracks.  A year later, Senoue revealed to Famitsu that Crush 40 had two album releases in the works, one of which was a "Best Of" album, due for release in September 2009.  He also announced the release of future songs that were not written for video games. The Best of Crush 40 – Super Sonic Songs was released on November 18, 2009.  In addition to compiling various Crush 40 songs from previous games, the album featured a new song, "Is It You," and a cover of "Fire Woman", a song released by The Cult in 1989. Senoue was also credited as a soloist on the 2009 Hardline album Leaving the End Open.

Rise Again, Live!, 2 Nights 2 Remember, and Driving Through Forever

After the 2010 release of Sonic Free Riders, Crush 40's contributions to Sonic the Hedgehog decreased. Senoue was no longer lead composer on games in the Sonic series after 2011's Sonic Generations. During the next few years, Crush 40 made more live performances and recordings. In 2010, Crush 40 performed live at the Summer of Sonic convention. The next year, Crush 40 recorded a single, "Song of Hope", as inspiration for hope for victims of the 2011 Tōhoku earthquake and tsunami. According to Senoue, the song was written for charity, specifically for the Red Cross. Subsequently, "Song of Hope" and three new songs were released as an EP called Rise Again. One of the included songs, "Sonic Youth", pays tribute to Crush 40's fans with numerous references to the band's past songs.

On March 29 and 30, 2012, Crush 40 performed live at Shibuya GUILTY in Tokyo, with Sonic Team producer Takashi Iizuka in the audience. From this concert, performed with Taneda and Kawamura, Crush 40's album Live! was recorded, and was released on October 3, 2012. The band also performed at the St. Louis Sonic Boom Festival in August 2013, and performed additional shows at the Summer of Sonic convention in 2012 and 2016, and San Diego Comic-Con conventions in 2016 and 2017. After more live performances at the Tokyo Game Show and Japan Game Music Festival 2013, in 2014 Crush 40 was announced for another two-night performance at Shibuya GUILTY.  For the concert, Senoue and Gioeli were joined by Taneda and Katsuji. The concert featured two new songs, as well as a performance of Hardline's "Love Leads the Way". Recorded from that performance, 2 Nights 2 Remember, Crush 40's second live album, was released on May 13, 2015.  It features four additional studio-recorded songs.

In 2018, Senoue was named lead composer for the soundtrack for Team Sonic Racing. He was requested to make the game's theme a song by Crush 40.  This led to Senoue and Gioeli recording "Green Light Ride" for the game, Crush 40's first Sonic game theme in several years.  The song was premiered at E3 2018, to a stronger reaction than Senoue expected.  A short version of the song was made available in December 2018, before the 2019 release of the game itself. Senoue expressed his joy at being able to record another game theme with Crush 40, twenty years after Crush 40 began. Subsequently, Crush 40 released another compilation album, Driving Through Forever, in 2019. In 2020, Gioeli re-recorded "Song of Hope" with Bulgarian vocalist Sevi, as a way of reconnecting with fans during the coronavirus pandemic. On June 23, 2021, Sega held a digital concert to honor 30 years of the Sonic franchise, with Crush 40 as one of the participating acts, alongside the Prague Philharmonic Orchestra and the Tomoya Ohtani Band. A live album of the concert was released to digital streaming services in September of the same year.

Musical style and legacy
According to Allegra Frank and Philip Kollar of Polygon, Crush 40 and Senoue have made "some of the most memorable butt rock tracks from Sonic history (and the history of video games in general)". Writing for Vice, Andy McDonald stated that Crush 40 helped to keep glam rock alive after grunge had supplanted it as a more popular style of rock music. Reviewing the album Crush 40, Chris Greening of Video Game Music Online highlights the hard rock sound and showing of Gioeli's experience in the vocals, stating that "Live & Learn" is "an ecstatic Americana rock anthem featuring Johnny at his best", while also stating the instrumentals are inspired by early 1990s heavy metal.  He calls the album "among the best of the genre in game music".

Gioeli, who is not a gamer, described his songwriting process with Senoue for games as being akin to writing a soundtrack for a movie, watching scenes from the game or looking at storyboards.  According to Gioeli, "Jun and I have our system—he starts with a musical feeling and sometimes a melody idea and then I go nuts with it! The lyrics do have to be approved for content, but that's it. We have the freedom to write what we feel is the right song for the scene." He has stated that among his three main projects—Crush 40, Hardline, and performing with Axel Rudi Pell—all three are different styles of rock music and he has to set himself in the "right emotions" to perform.

When interviewed about his style and that of the band, Jun Senoue said, "I know what my style is, and I know what my favourite genres of music are. I listen to a lot of metal music, as well as other genres of music, and my inspiration is always there. The style of the music in the game does change, and it gives a great sense of progression... When we got together to write stuff for Shadow [the Hedgehog], we found that our fresh ideas were a lot different to the songs we'd written back in 2002 – our sound had changed." Senoue has stated that the tempo of each song written for a game is based on how it is planned to be used and what would be suitable, but those songs not for a game are what the duo want to perform.

Writing for Fanbyte, Sean Aitchison stated that Crush 40 provided a signature musical style for the Sonic the Hedgehog series and expanded the musical tastes of Sonic fans.  According to Aitchison, "The band embedded themselves in the memories and hearts of an entire generation of Sonic fans. Though their contributions to the Sonic franchise may be small in number, they are massive in impact." Kofi-Charu Nat Turner's 2008 study of media usage in an American urban middle school listed the band as a common interest within the group studied.

Discography

Games

Notes

References

1998 establishments in Japan
Japanese glam metal musical groups
Japanese hard rock musical groups
Musical groups established in 1998
Sonic the Hedgehog
Video game composers
Video game musicians